Paractaea is a genus of crabs in the family Xanthidae, containing the following species:

Paractaea excentrica Guinot, 1969
Paractaea garretti (Rathbun, 1906)
Paractaea indica Deb, 1985
Paractaea margaritaria (A. Milne-Edwards, 1868)
Paractaea monodi Guinot, 1969
Paractaea nodosa (Stimpson, 1860)
Paractaea philippinensis (Ward, 1942)
Paractaea rebieri Guinot, 1969
Paractaea retusa (Nobili, 1905)
Paractaea rufopunctata (H. Milne-Edwards, 1834)
Paractaea secundarathbunae Guinot, 1969
Paractaea sulcata (Stimpson, 1860)
Paractaea tumulosa (Odhner, 1925)
Paractaea typica Deb, 1989

References

Xanthoidea